Jesper Moller (Danish: Møller) is a Danish animator, screenwriter and movie-director.

After initially working as character animator at Sullivan Bluth Studios under the direction of Don Bluth, he joined Danish animation studio A. Film A/S in Copenhagen, Denmark.

After a period as the creative head of Feature Animation, also acting as sequence director on several films, he went on to co-direct (with Stefan Fjeldmark) the 2006 film Asterix and the Vikings, based on René Goscinny and Albert Uderzo's comic book.

In March 2008, Jesper Møller founded Copenhagen-based independent movie company Parka Pictures ApS. In January 2012 veteran German animation producer Lilian Klages joined Parka Pictures as CEO and Executive Producer.

Awards and nominations 
In 2011, Jesper Møller was nominated "Director of the Year" at the Cartoon Movie 2011 in Lyon – France, for Sandman and the Lost Sand of Dreams.

Filmography 
1988–1990: Animator on All Dogs Go to Heaven, Rock-a-Doodle and A Troll in Central Park.

1991: Animator on FernGully: The Last Rainforest.

1992: Animator on Once Upon a Forest.

1993: Animator on Thumbelina.

1993: Animator on Asterix Conquers America.
Supervising animator on Jungledyret Hugo.

1994: Animator on Felidae.

1994–1995: Storyboard/Development/Directing animator on All Dogs Go to Heaven 2.
Directing animator on Jungledyret Hugo 2.

1996–1997: Sequence Director on Quest for Camelot.

1998–1999: Storyboard/Development/Directing animator on Help! I'm a Fish.

2000: Storyboard/Development on Troll Story.

2001: Sequence Director on Eight Crazy Nights.
Storyboard on Tarzan II.

2002–2006: Director and Character Designer on Asterix and the Vikings.

2006-: Director on Mikisoq.

2009: Screenplay on Mikisoq.

2010–2011: Director on Prototyp (Pilot).
(In development)

2011: Screenplay on Harvie and the Magic Museum.

2010s: Character designer on Asterix: The Mansions of the Gods
 Writer/Producer on Latte and the Magic Waterstone

References 
 
 Mikisoq – The Story

20th-century births
Living people
Danish animators
Danish animated film directors
Danish film directors
Danish male screenwriters
Danish storyboard artists
Year of birth missing (living people)